The 2009 Odlum Brown Vancouver Open was a professional tennis tournament played on outdoor hard courts. It was the 5th edition, for men, and 8th edition, for women, of the tournament and part of the 2009 ATP Challenger Tour and the 2009 ITF Women's Circuit, offering totals of $100,000, for men, and $75,000, for women, in prize money. It took place in West Vancouver, British Columbia, Canada between August 3 and August 9, 2009.

Men's singles main-draw entrants

Seeds

1 Rankings are as of July 27, 2009

Other entrants
The following players received wildcards into the singles main draw:
 Philip Bester
 Devin Britton
 Taylor Dent
 Ryan Harrison

The following player entered the singles main draw with a special exempt:
 Kevin Anderson

The following players received entry from the qualifying draw:
 Lester Cook
 Igor Sijsling
 Tim Smyczek
 Kaes Van't Hof

Champions

Men's singles

 Marcos Baghdatis def.  Xavier Malisse, 6–4, 6–4

Women's singles

 Stéphanie Dubois def.  Sania Mirza, 6–1, 6–4

Men's doubles

 Kevin Anderson /  Rik de Voest def.  Ramón Delgado /  Kaes Van't Hof, 6–4, 6–4

Women's doubles

 Ahsha Rolle /  Riza Zalameda def.  Madison Brengle /  Lilia Osterloh, 6–4, 6–3

External links
Official website

Odlum Brown Vancouver Open
Odlum Brown Vancouver Open
Vancouver Open
Odlum Brown Vancouver Open
Odlum Brown Vancouver Open